Africae munus (Africa's commitment) is the third post-synodal apostolic exhortation issued by Pope Benedict XVI. It was signed on 19 November 2011 in Benin.

References

External links 

 

Apostolic exhortations
Documents of Pope Benedict XVI
Catholic theology and doctrine
Catholicism in Africa
2011 documents
2011 in Christianity